John Bowden was Governor of the Bank of England from 1822 to 1824. He had been Deputy Governor from 1820 to 1822. He replaced Charles Pole as Governor and was succeeded by Cornelius Buller.

See also
Chief Cashier of the Bank of England

References

External links
 

Governors of the Bank of England
Year of birth missing
Year of death missing
British bankers
Deputy Governors of the Bank of England